Hessle is a town, civil parish and electoral ward in the East Riding of Yorkshire, England,  west of Kingston upon Hull city centre. Geographically it is part of a larger urban area consisting of the city of Kingston upon Hull, the town of Hessle and a number of other villages but is not part of the city. It is on the north bank of the Humber Estuary where the Humber Bridge crosses.

According to the 2011 UK census, Hessle parish had a population of 15,000, an increase on the 2001 UK census figure of 14,767.

Amenities

The centre of Hessle is the Square. There are many shops and a small bus station, which was refitted in 2007. Hessle All Saints' Church is located just off the Square and was designated a Grade I listed building in 1967 and is now recorded in the National Heritage List for England, maintained by Historic England. Hessle Town Hall was built in 1897 and is situated at the top of South Lane. Hessle Police Station, which closed in 2014, is next door to the town hall at the top of South Lane and the corner of Ferriby Road.

Hessle is home to the world-famous Humber Bridge, which was opened by Queen Elizabeth II in 1981. At the time of its opening, the Humber Bridge was the world's longest single-span suspension bridge. It links Hessle to the town of Barton-upon-Humber on the opposite side of the river Humber. In July 2017 the bridge was granted Grade I listed status.

History

The place-name 'Hessle' is first attested in the Domesday Book of 1086, where it appears as Hase. It appears as Hesla in a Danelaw Charter from the reign of Henry II between 1154 and 1189, and as Hesel in a Yorkshire Charter of 1157, and in 1242 in the Book of Fees. The name is the Old Scandinavian hesli meaning 'hazel grove'.

In more modern times, Hessle has been a centre for shipbuilding. Before 1897, there was a shipyard building wooden boats, but it was then bought by Henry Scarr who moved there from Beverley, where he had previously been in partnership with his brother Joseph. Scarr produced iron and steel ships until 1932, when the yard was taken over by Richard Dunston. It was the largest shipyard in Hessle, building vessels such as Loch Riddon, a roll-on/roll-off ferry launched in 1986, and one of four built for Caledonian MacBrayne for use in the Hebrides. The company went into liquidation in 1987 and was bought by Damen Shipyards Group in the same year. Dunston's was closed down in 1994. The location is now used as offices, car sales buildings and a dock for scrap metal and other materials for dispatch to other areas, or to be recycled. Richard Dunston's ship repairs still exists further east along the Humber Estuary, with activity remaining high.

Geography
Hessle is surrounded by the neighbouring villages of Willerby, Anlaby, Kirk Ella, West Ella, North Ferriby and Swanland.

Chalk-quarrying was a major industry at Hessle into the 20th century and quarries can still be seen in the west of the town, the largest being the Humber Bridge Country Park, which is a popular tourist attraction. Part of it is known as Little Switzerland (Little Switz or Switzy for short).

The Humber Bridge Country Park Local Nature Reserve was formerly a chalk quarry and was developed as a country park following the construction of the Humber Bridge. It consists of mixed species of woodland, wild flowers, a spring-fed pond and herb-rich grassland. The park can be explored on several well-signed walking routes.

Hessle is twinned with the French town of Bourg-de-Thizy.

Transport to and from Hessle is convenient, with good access to main roads such as the A15, A63 and M62 (via the A63). It also has a railway station with hourly services to and from Hull and to destinations such as Doncaster and York. Regular bus services provided by East Yorkshire link the town with the surrounding villages, Hull City Centre, Longhill Estate in east Hull as well as further afield places including Brough, Beverley and the seaside resort of Hornsea.

Hessle is at the start of the Yorkshire Wolds Way, a long-distance footpath and designated National Trail, which crosses the Yorkshire Wolds and ends at Filey on the Holderness Coast.

Education
The site of the town's secondary school, Hessle High School & Sixth Form College, on Heads Lane, is centred on a building donated to the Education Authority by Algernon Henry Barkworth, a survivor of the RMS Titanic sinking. Hessle Sixth Form College is part of a consortium with secondary schools Wolfreton School (in Willerby) and Cottingham High School (in Cottingham), offering sixth form pupils a chance to attend classes at any of the three schools within the consortium.  The entire school was reopened in January 2016, as part of Priority Schools Building Programme.  Since January 2017, Penshurst Primary School and Hessle High School & Sixth Form College have been a through-school.

Penshurst Primary School, for children aged 3–11, located on Winthorpe Road.  Hessle is also home to All Saints' CE Federation of Academies Infant and Junior School, a Church of England school for children aged 3–11,  located on Northolme Road.

2007 floods
On 25 June 2007, torrential rain hit the north-east of England and 100 mm of rain fell in a few hours. Several people died across the affected area and the first fatality occurred in Hessle. A 28-year-old man became trapped when his foot was stuck in a storm drain. He was overwhelmed by rising water and although emergency services gave him oxygen he died of hypothermia. Sky News filmed the operation and broadcast some of the footage in the days after the event. They were criticised for this but responded that the victim's family had approved the broadcast.

The floods caused the formation of a local residents association, HCARA (Hessle Community Action Residents Association) who worked with various bodies to campaign for improvements in defences against floods in the lower Hessle area. The local MP, Alan Johnson, as well as representatives of the Environment Agency, East Riding of Yorkshire Council and the Flood Forum were among the speakers at the resident meetings. HCARA, having operated to facilitate the distribution of news to Hessle residents immediately after the 2007 floods, is currently dormant.

As a result of consultation with the residents, the Environment Agency promoted a flood storage scheme which was constructed in a field off Beverley Road in Hessle from 2010 to 2011. A flow control structure was built on the downstream end of the watercourse and the bank of the Western Drain was lowered on the West Side.

In a very heavy storm, when the capacity of the control structure is exceeded, water overflows into the storage area. After the storm, the (stored) water returns to the Western Drain through a small diameter land drainage pipe. The lagoon holds around 35,000 cubic metres of water. The storage area remains dry for the majority of the time and looks from the road side to be a paddock, albeit lower than surrounding fields.

Hessle Feast
Earliest found records of the Hessle Feast date from the 1800s. These have it as an annual event around Whitsuntide (May). A time of enjoyment, when the people of the parish would gather to celebrate the coming year.

From articles in 1808 and 1836, it is clear that the feast had become a major event bringing in people from neighbouring towns and villages. With much excitement, racing, noise and jubilee. As ever the youth made it their own. Even in the earliest reports, there are churchwardens concerns over noisy and drunken behaviour "particularly of the young men of Hull" who visited the parish.

Resurrected around 15 years ago, after many years of absence, the feast has again become an event of enjoyment and embraced by the whole community of Hessle.

Previous feasts include one which occurred in July 2006, which succeeded in attracting over 5,000 local residents and visitors to the area and was an entertaining day of charitable money raising, family fun and live music. The event hosted many activities such as a "Battle of the Bands" which took place on the main stage in the Square, a "Buskathon" centred down Prestongate, and local bands centred on a smaller stage on the Weir. There was also a boat race around the streets of Hessle, which was eventually won by army cadets carrying an inflatable float. The event was partly-funded and majorly sponsored by Kingston Communications and Yorkshire Water – companies working in the area at the time.

Hessle Feast returned, after a three-year absence due to the 2007 United Kingdom floods, in 2009. It was officially opened by the then Home Secretary, Hull West and Hessle MP, Alan Johnson, and the Mayor of Hessle, Frank Kitchen, at 1 p.m.

The feast day in 2009 entertained crowds over a larger area than previous feasts, to encourage more business to the less immediate areas of Hessle. In the Square, the main stage starred the "Hessle's Got Talent" final and the "Crave and Serenity Fashion Show". The Square's stage was compared by KCFM DJ Dave Hudson. Prestongate had further stalls and barbecues. The Weir also had a stage with live music played all afternoon. On the feast day, a world record for "poppadom stacking" was broken on the Weir by the Indian takeaway Jolsha, officiated by the local MP Alan Johnson. Following on from the Weir is Tower Hill Park, which was mainly occupied by the army who had assault courses and climbing walls, which, as in previous years, focused on activities for the younger generations. The feast also reached the area near the library, which held a third stage with live local bands chosen by The Hase pub. The boat race was won by the youth sports team Norland Sharks, who were the fastest at running around Hessle carrying an inflatable boat. The Hessle Feast 2009 Committee was an independent body of unpaid volunteers that organised the event in the pubs of Hessle. The event was majorly sponsored by KCFM and Hull Colour Pages, with additional funding from the local town council.

The 2012 Hessle Feast was timed to take place on the Sunday of the weekend of celebrations for the Diamond Jubilee of Elizabeth II in June 2012. The following day, a waterborne procession of sailing and powered craft departed from Hessle and proceeded around the River Humber.

Sport
The most popular sport in Hessle is football. Hessle is home to three senior football clubs, Hessle Rangers, Hessle United, and Hessle Sporting, the latter of which plays in the Humber Premier League Premier Division – level 13 on the English football league system pyramid. The clubs also have a large section of junior teams playing in the Hull Boys Sunday Football League. Also, there is a cricket team and a rugby team at the Hessle rugby club near the foreshore.

Notable people
 Stephen C. West (born 1952) biochemist and molecular biologist, expert  on DNA recombination and repair. Born in Hessle.

Bibliography

References

External links

 
 MyHessle.com – a hyper-local website covering everything that is happening in Hessle and HU13 postcode 

 
Towns in the East Riding of Yorkshire
Civil parishes in the East Riding of Yorkshire
Ports and harbours of the Humber